A ring-enhancing lesion is an abnormal radiologic sign on MRI or CT scans obtained using radiocontrast. On the image, there is an area of decreased density (see radiodensity) surrounded by a bright rim from concentration of the enhancing contrast dye. This enhancement may represent breakdown of the blood-brain barrier and the development of an inflammatory capsule. This can be a finding in numerous disease states. In the brain, it can occur with an early brain abscess as well as in Nocardia infections associated with lung cavitary lesions. In patients with HIV, the major differential is between CNS lymphoma and CNS toxoplasmosis, with CT imaging being the appropriate next step to differentiate between the two conditions.

References

External links
 Ring Enhancement: The Free Medical Dictionary

Neuroimaging
Radiologic signs